Christopher Mitchelmore MHA (born October 23, 1985) is a Canadian politician, who represented St. Barbe-L'Anse aux Meadows in the Newfoundland and Labrador House of Assembly from the 2011 provincial election until the 2021 provincial election.

Background
Mitchelmore is a native of Green Island Cove, a tiny fishing village on the Great Northern Peninsula. At 16 years of age he founded "Flower's Island Museum". He added a Newfoundland-themed miniature golf course, gift shop and summer festival. The business operated until 2005, when Mitchelmore focused on completing his post-secondary education.

After graduating from Canon Richards High School, Flower's Cove in 2003, Mitchelmore went on to complete a Bachelor of Commerce Honours (Co-op) from Memorial University of Newfoundland. His university experience enabled him to work for the Department of Innovation, Trade & Rural Development, Newfoundland & Labrador Board of Commissioners of Public Utilities (PUB) and London Offshore Consultants (LOC) Group. He studied, both in the UK and at the University of Economics, Prague, Czech Republic. In 2008, he received the James Barnes Award for Academic Excellence.

Mitchelmore was employed with the Association of Professional Engineers, Geologists, Geophysicists of Alberta (APEGGA) and Community Business Development Corporation (CBDC) Nortip as a Youth Ventures Coordinator and most recently as a Client Services Officer, a role focused on creating and maintaining employment through business services, financing, skill enhancements, technical assistance, counselling and community economic development.

He has been engaged at the local, regional, provincial and national level, serving as the vice-President of the Straits-St. Barbe Chronic Care Corporation; Junior Achievement, Regional Chair; Director and Member of the Canadian Community Economic Development Network; co-Chair of Emerging Leaders; and Director with Nordic Economic Development Corporation.

Politics
Mitchelmore was elected to the Newfoundland and Labrador House of Assembly in the 2011 provincial election for the district of The Straits – White Bay North representing the New Democratic Party (NDP).

On October 29, 2013 Mitchelmore left the NDP caucus after himself and all other NDP caucus members signed a letter calling on Lorraine Michael to hold a leadership election and Michael only agreed to a leadership review. On January 27, 2014 Mitchelmore resigned his NDP membership and sat as an Independent MHA with no formal connections to any political party.

On February 4, 2014 Mitchelmore and St. John's North MHA Dale Kirby joined the Liberal Party of NL.

Mitchelmore served as a member on the Public Accounts Committee until February 2014.

On May 9, 2014, Jerome Ward, a long-time Liberal and Special Assistant to Humber-St. Barbe-Baie Verte Liberal MP Gerry Byrne, announced that he would be seeking the nomination for The Straits-White Bay North. Mitchelmore won the nomination with 73 percent of the popular vote taking 1,127 votes and Ward receiving 423.

Mitchelmore was re-elected in the 2015 provincial election in the redistributed district of St. Barbe-L'Anse aux Meadows as a Liberal candidate and was subsequently appointed to cabinet. He served as Minister of Tourism, Culture, Industry and Innovation from 2015 to 2019.

Mitchelmore was re-elected in the 2019 provincial election defeating PC candidate and Roddickton-Bide Arm mayor Sheila Fitzgerald. On September 6, 2019, he was appointed Minister of Advanced Education, Skills and Labour following a cabinet shuffle. On December 5, 2019 the House of Assembly voted to reprimand Mitchelmore for his hiring of Carla Foote, daughter of Judy Foote, at The Rooms despite her lack of qualifications and her political connections to the Liberals. The House of Assembly ordered that Mitchelmore apologize to the Board of Directors of The Rooms, to the House of Assembly, and also be suspended two-week without pay.

On August 19, 2020 Mitchelmore announced that he is not seeking re-election and was concurrently dropped from cabinet.

Electoral history

|-
 
|Liberal
|Christopher Mitchelmore
|align="right"|3,474
|align="right"|60.80
|align="right"|
|-
 
|Progressive Conservative
|Sheila Fitzgerald
|align="right"|2036
|align="right"|36.20
|align="right"|
|-

|}

|-
 
|Liberal
|Christopher Mitchelmore
|align="right"|4,359
|align="right"|89.32
|align="right"|+53.1
|-
 
|NDP
|Genevieve Brouillette
|align="right"|117
|align="right"|2.40
|align="right"|-25.5
|-

|}

|-
 
|NDP
|Christopher Mitchelmore
|align="right"|1,537
|align="right"|36.74
|align="right"|+28.81
|-
 
|Liberal
|Marshall Dean
|align="right"|1,327
|align="right"|31.71
|align="right"|-15.87
|-

|}

References

External links
 Christopher Mitchelmore's blog

Living people
Newfoundland and Labrador New Democratic Party MHAs
People from St. Anthony, Newfoundland and Labrador
1985 births
Liberal Party of Newfoundland and Labrador MHAs
Members of the Executive Council of Newfoundland and Labrador
Independent MHAs in Newfoundland and Labrador
21st-century Canadian politicians